'''Yerevan Basketball is a professional basketball club based in Yerevan, Armenia. Founded in 2019, it currently plays in the Armenia Basketball League A.

History
Erebuni was founded in 2019 to participate in the 2019–20 Armenia Basketball League A season.

Season by season

References

External links
Official Facebook account

Basketball teams in Armenia
Basketball teams established in 2018
2018 establishments in Armenia